Boadicea is a 1927 British historical film directed by Sinclair Hill and starring Phyllis Neilson-Terry, Lillian Hall-Davis, and Clifford McLaglen. It depicts the life of the Celtic Queen Boudica (Boadicea) and her rebellion against the Roman Empire.

Cast
 Phyllis Neilson-Terry as Queen Boadicea 
 Lillian Hall-Davis as Emmelyn 
 Clifford McLaglen as Marcus 
 Sybil Rhoda as Blondicca 
 Fred Raynham as Badwallon 
 Clifford Heatherley as Catus Decianus 
 Humberston Wright as Prasutagus 
 Edward O'Neill as Caradoc 
 Cyril McLaglen as Madoc 
 Roy Raymond as Burrus
 Wally Patch as Officer in Roman Army

References

Bibliography
 Low, Rachael. History of the British Film, 1918-1929. George Allen & Unwin, 1971.

External links

1927 films
1920s biographical films
1920s historical films
Biographical films about royalty
British biographical films
British silent feature films
Fiction set in Roman Britain
Films set in the 1st century
Films directed by Sinclair Hill
Films set in the Roman Empire
British historical films
Cultural depictions of Boudica
British black-and-white films
1920s English-language films
1920s British films